Shelby Shook Gaines is an American composer, musician, and writer. He is the son of novelist Charles Gaines and artist Patricia Ellisor Gaines.

Early life and music career
Gaines was born and raised in New Hampshire, and has two siblings, Latham Gaines and Greta Gaines. He studied music at Brown University.

He began working in music production and sound design in the mid-1990s in San Francisco and later New York City. He played steel pan professionally and briefly toured with the Trinidad-based Our Boys Steel Orchestra. Gaines produced and co-wrote for other artists, while writing and recording his own music (under his name as well as his middle name, Shook). His song "Aquaworld" was included on Accidental Records' compilation You Are Here. Gaines' most frequent music collaborator in New York was guitarist Kareem "Jesus" Devlin.

Film score, theater and visual art
Gaines later moved into performance and visual art, composing ballet scores and also working with his brother, Latham Gaines, as an art-music duo known as GAINES. The brothers create sound sculptures from found materials, which are then used for film scoring, performance and art exhibits. Their live score for Ethan Hawke's revival of Sam Shepard's A Lie of the Mind earned them a Drama Desk Award nomination. Other theater work includes the creation of instruments and the music for Clive, Jonathan Marc Sherman's play, directed by Ethan Hawke. 

Gaines was the sound producer for Blaze, based on the life of musician Blaze Foley, starring Ben Dickey, Alia Shawkat, Sam Rockwell, Steve Zahn, Kris Kristofferson, and Richard Linklater. 

Gaines and his brother scored the 2019 film The Kid, directed by Vincent D'Onofrio and starring Hawke, Chris Pratt, Dane DeHaan, Leila George and Jake Schur.

References

Year of birth missing (living people)
Living people
American male composers
Musicians from New Hampshire
Brown University alumni
Place of birth missing (living people)
American male musicians